River Rwizi is a river located in South Western Uganda in district called Mbarara.

Overview
It originates from Buhweju hills with various tributaries from various Nkore hills including Ntungamo and Sheema hills which join it. It pours its water in Lake Victoria via the drainage systems of Lake Mburo, Lake Kachera and Kijanebalola.

River Rwizi supplies water for both domestic and industrial use to the whole Mbarara town and the neighbouring towns of Bwizibwera, Sanga and Biharwe.

The river is drying out due to climate changes affecting the region and other causes like

The water hyacinth which is also an inductor of polluted water with a lot of nutrients with in it

The river destruction is also due to wide spread  of land grabbing along the river banks 

A lot of untreated wastes are dumped into the river thus leading to contribution of pollution of water forex maple  waste products from iron and steel industry in kakoba and Mbarara mainly hospital

Points of interest
There are some economic activities carried along and within river Rrwizi  by the people surrounding it 

FARMING  

people around river Rwizi have started to encroach the wetlands to practice crop growing due to its fertile land that has increased the yields and live stock farming 

Brick making 

people are using sand from the river to make bricks for sell and building houses

Harvest of papyrus 

people are get papyrus for making mats ,baskets, chairs and ropes to earn a living 

fishing

people have practice  fishing within the river that is harvested fish  for food and selling in markets too

 Rwizi Water falls in Katete, Mbarara.
 Katete Beach.
 Ngaro Mwenda Bridge in Mbarara 3 km off Kabale Road.
 Rwizi Meanders near Mbarara University.

References

Sources

Rwizi
Rwizi